This article presents a list of the historical events and publications of Australian literature during 1932.

Events 
 The final issue of Aussie: The Australian Soldiers' Magazine appears.

Books 

 Marie Bjelke-Petersen — The Rainbow Lute
 Eleanor Dark — Slow Dawning
 Jean Devanny — Poor Swine
 Norman Lindsay
 The Cautious Amorist
 Mr Gresham and Olympus
 Leonard Mann — Flesh in Armour
 Vance Palmer — Daybreak
 Alice Grant Rosman — Benefits Received
 Nevil Shute — Lonely Road
 E. V. Timms — Alicia Deane
 Arthur W. Upfield
 Breakaway House
 Gripped by Drought
 Mr Jelly's Business
 A Royal Abduction

Poetry 

 Dulcie Deamer — Messalina
 C. J. Dennis — "'I Dips me Lid' to the Sydney Harbour Bridge"
 Mary Gilmore
 "The Men of Eureka (A Recollection)"
 "The Myall in Prison"
 Under the Wilgas
 Will H. Ogilvie — The Collected Sporting Verse of Will H. Ogilvie
 Katharine Susannah Prichard — The Earth Lover and Other Verses
 Kenneth Slessor
 Cuckooz Contrey
 "My Lady's Maid"

Biographies 

 Ion Idriess — Flynn of the Inland

Awards and honours

Literary

Births 

A list, ordered by date of birth (and, if the date is either unspecified or repeated, ordered alphabetically by surname) of births in 1932 of Australian literary figures, authors of written works or literature-related individuals follows, including year of death.

 7 January — Katharine Brisbane, critic
 6 July — Ted Egan, poet
 16 July — Christopher Koch, novelist (died 2013)

Deaths 

A list, ordered by date of death (and, if the date is either unspecified or repeated, ordered alphabetically by surname) of deaths in 1932 of Australian literary figures, authors of written works or literature-related individuals follows, including year of birth.

 8 April – Hubert Church, poet (born 1857)
23 June — Francis Kenna, poet (born 1865)
 12 July — Fergus Hume, novelist (born 1859)
 5 October — Christopher Brennan, poet (born 1870)

See also 
 1932 in poetry
 List of years in literature
 List of years in Australian literature
 1932 in literature
 1931 in Australian literature
 1932 in Australia
 1933 in Australian literature

References

Literature
Australian literature by year
20th-century Australian literature